Frederick Moosbrugger (9 October 1900 – 1 October 1974) was an officer of the United States Navy eventually attaining the rank of vice admiral. He is best known for his service in World War II as a highly successful commander of destroyer squadrons.

Early life 
He was born in Philadelphia, Pennsylvania, the son of Jacob and Rosina (Maier Ritzer) Moosbrugger. He entered the United States Naval Academy at Annapolis, Maryland, on 25 June 1919. He graduated and commissioned as ensign on 8 June 1923.

Military career 
He returned to the United States to serve briefly at Headquarters, 13th Naval District in May 1927.

Returning to Annapolis as an instructor, he remained there for three years, then joined . He served aboard that cruiser from 1 June 1934 to 29 May 1937. He then reported for his second tour of duty at the U.S. Naval Academy, where he was an instructor in the Department of Ordnance and Gunnery.

He was in command at the time of the Japanese attack on Pearl Harbor on 7 December 1941, and subsequently directed the activities of that destroyer in close cooperation with a carrier task group to cover the reinforcement of Samoa, to conduct raids on Wake Island and Minami Torishima, and to perform escort and screening duties in hazardous waters.

From May 1942 until September 1943, he had successive command of Destroyer Divisions 11 and 12, carrying out patrol and escort missions to Guadalcanal and the Russell Islands, supporting operations at New Georgia, Rendova, and Vangunu, and patrolling the Solomon Islands.  He was in command during the smashing U.S. victory at the Battle of Vella Gulf in August 1943.

Returning to the United States, he assumed command on 5 April 1946, with the rank of captain, of the U.S. Naval School, General Line, Naval Base, Newport, Rhode Island. On 1 June 1951, he was promoted to rear admiral, having temporarily served as a commodore from 6 April 1945 until 5 April 1946. In 1952, he became Commander Military Sea Transportation Service, Pacific Area, with headquarters in San Francisco, California.

In December 1952, he became superintendent of the U.S. Naval Postgraduate School, Monterey, California, and, in December 1955, reported as Commander Training Command, U.S. Pacific Fleet. He was transferred to the Retired List of the United States Navy on 1 October 1956, and was advanced to the rank of vice admiral.

Vice Admiral Moosbrugger died October 1, 1974 in a San Diego hospital.  He was married to Miss Dorothy E. Britt of Rydal, Pennsylvania, in January 1932. They had three sons, Frederick Britt Moosbrugger, Edward Arthur Moosbrugger and David B. Moosbrugger.

Namesake 
The United States Navy named the Spruance class destroyer USS Moosbrugger (DD-980) in his honor.

Medals 
In addition to the Navy Cross, the Distinguished Service Medal, the Legion of Merit with Combat "V," and the Commendation Ribbon, Moosbrugger received the Yangtze Service Medal, American Defense Service Medal, Fleet Clasp, the American Campaign Medal, Asiatic-Pacific Campaign Medal, the World War II Victory Medal, the Philippine Liberation Ribbon, the Navy Occupation Service Medal, Asia Clasp, the National Defense Service Medal, the Korean Service Medal, and the United Nations Service Medal.

See also

References 

Battle of Vella Gulf

1900 births
1974 deaths
United States Naval Academy alumni
Military personnel from Philadelphia
United States Navy personnel of World War II
Recipients of the Navy Cross (United States)
Recipients of the Legion of Merit
United States Navy admirals
Recipients of the Navy Distinguished Service Medal
Burials at Fort Rosecrans National Cemetery